The Kroloteans are a fictional extraterrestrial race existing in the DC Universe. They first appear in Green Lantern (vol. 4) #4.

Fictional character biography
Native to the planet Krolotea in Space Sector 2812, the Kroloteans, who were also known as Gremlins, were an insidious race who performed genetic experiments on subjects in an unethical attempt at creating a scientifically advanced race of super warriors to sell to the highest bidder. They had no compunctions with manipulating the evolution of other species as part of their experimentations, so long as it produced highly destructive "weapons" which they could sell to their clients. At some point, they began arriving on the planet Earth, where they became known as Gremlins. They are responsible for the experiments done on Hector Hammond, Black Hand, and The Shark. Kroloteans are known to experiment on numerous species throughout the universe.

Villain of Green Lantern
The Green Lantern Venizz during her service managed to uncover a Krolotean concentration camp where she liberated its prisoners who were subjected to various experiments by the Gremlins. Among the many victims was a being known as Tagort whose body and strength were overgrown as a result of his captors experimentation's. They were notably allied with Evil Star who referred to them as his "Starlings" and were searching for the Black that was linked to the prophecy of the Blackest Night. The Gremlins later returned where they abducted a Human being and conducted experiments in artificial evolution on him which turned him into a Roswell Grey type of creature whereupon he was returned to Earth. Once there, he was killed when a truck ran him over by accident to which the individual stated that all he did was go out for a cigarette. Investigating the situation, Hal Jordan was contacted by the Belle Reve prison authority which informed him that Hector Hammond had information on the event. Going to the prison, Jordan bargained with Hammond who eventually revealed that he did not know the creatures names but they were responsible for transforming him as well as conducted numerous experiments over the years and that they had returned to keep watch over another experiment. They also kept track on the movements of William Hand and abducted him whilst he was on an airplane. Once among them, they began experimenting on him and returned him to Earth with the intention of him fighting against Hal Jordan by giving him the ability to absorb the life force of living creatures which would regenerate his severed hand that he lost to Jordan when he was The Spectre. They also made a move on abducting Hector Hammond again. In the meantime, the Kroloteans had found another test subject in a Shark which they genetically engineered and evolved to the point it became a humanoid entity that began terrorizing the coast. This attracted the attention of Hal Jordan who struggled against the beast until the Gremlins arrived to take both subjects on board their ship for further testing. As the two are taken aboard the alien ship, the Kroloteans secured the Shark and were about to experiment on Hal Jordan when Hammond mentally woke him up. The Green Lantern than proceeded to trap the Gremlins in small cages whereupon he asked his power ring on who the aliens were to which it responded that the Kroloteans tampered with a planet's natural resources and accelerated its evolution. Despite the aid of Black Hand, the Kroloteans were defeated and their plot thwarted and they were handed over Venizz and Tagort in order to bring the criminals to justice for their genetic atrocities. Unknown to many, the Gremlins latest experiment on Hector Hammond had given further abilities to the evolved Human such as gaining the power of speech.

Sinestro Corps
At least one member of the species known as Gleen was selected as a member of the Sinestro Corps who was assigned to Space Sector 0312. Amongst his species, Gleen is considered the cruelest and most twisted. He is annihilated by Alpha Lantern Varix when he attempts to break Sinestro out of his prison transport.

Powers and weapons
The Kroloteans are an advanced space-faring race. They are skilled in advanced science and genetic engineering. Using lower lifeforms as their test subjects, they have tampered with the evolutionary patterns of over a thousand species.

In other media

Television
 The Kroloteans appear as villains in the Young Justice television series. They are presented as a culture that revolves around theft. Their presence is first made known in the Episode "Happy New Year". The bounty hunter Lobo captures a Krolotean who had kidnapped and replaced Secretary-General Tseng, leading to the revelation that there were numerous Kroloteans disguised as humans on Earth. They appear to be extremely afraid of Blue Beetle, something that baffles the hero and his companions even when he stopped the Krolotean that was posing as Bibbo Bibbowski. This is eventually explained due to the fact that the Kroloteans and The Reach are fierce rivals. In the episode "Earthlings", the heroes discover that the Kroloteans have been arriving on Earth via the use of stolen Zeta tubes from Rann. Superboy, Miss Martian, Beast Boy and Alanna successfully destroy one of the Zeta facilities before returning home.

References

External links
 Kroloteans at Comic Vine

DC Comics alien species
DC Comics extraterrestrial supervillains
Green Lantern characters